The 1950 Texas Tech Red Raiders football team represented Texas Technological College—now known as Texas Tech University—as a member of the Border Conference during the 1950 college football season. Led by Dell Morgan in his tenth and final season as head coach, the Red Raiders compiled an overall record of 3–8 with a mark of 3–2 in conference play, placing fourth in the Border Conference.

Schedule

References

Texas Tech
Texas Tech Red Raiders football seasons
Texas Tech Red Raiders football